Sergey Andreyevich Baranov (born 10 August 1981 in Horlivka) is a Russian volleyball player. He was a member of the national team that won the bronze medal at the 2004 Summer Olympics in Athens. He currently play for VC Lokomotiv-Belogorie.

Trophies
Club
Russian Volleyball Super League : 2003, 2004, 2005
Russian Volleyball Cup : 2003, 2005
CEV Champions League : 2003, 2004
With the Russian National Team
Men's European Volleyball League : 2005

External links
 profile

1981 births
Living people
People from Horlivka
Russian men's volleyball players
Olympic volleyball players of Russia
Volleyball players at the 2004 Summer Olympics
Olympic bronze medalists for Russia
Olympic medalists in volleyball
Medalists at the 2004 Summer Olympics